Jacqueline McKenzie (born 16 April 1973) is an Australian swimmer. She competed in two events at the 1992 Summer Olympics. She is the daughter of Olympic swimmer, Lyn McClements.

McKenzie also competed at the 1994 Commonwealth Games and finished seventh in the 200m individual medley.

References

External links
 

1973 births
Living people
Olympic swimmers of Australia
Swimmers at the 1992 Summer Olympics
Place of birth missing (living people)
Swimmers at the 1994 Commonwealth Games
Australian female medley swimmers
Commonwealth Games competitors for Australia
20th-century Australian women